The 1928 Washington Senators won 75 games, lost 79, and finished in fourth place in the American League. They were managed by Bucky Harris and played home games at Griffith Stadium.

Offseason 
 February 1, 1928: Tris Speaker was released by the Senators.

Regular season

Season standings

Record vs. opponents

Roster

Player stats

Batting

Starters by position 
Note: Pos = Position; G = Games played; AB = At bats; H = Hits; Avg. = Batting average; HR = Home runs; RBI = Runs batted in

Other batters 
Note: G = Games played; AB = At bats; H = Hits; Avg. = Batting average; HR = Home runs; RBI = Runs batted in

Pitching

Starting pitchers 
Note: G = Games pitched; IP = Innings pitched; W = Wins; L = Losses; ERA = Earned run average; SO = Strikeouts

Other pitchers 
Note: G = Games pitched; IP = Innings pitched; W = Wins; L = Losses; ERA = Earned run average; SO = Strikeouts

Relief pitchers 
Note: G = Games pitched; W = Wins; L = Losses; SV = Saves; ERA = Earned run average; SO = Strikeouts

Notes

References 
1928 Washington Senators at Baseball-Reference
1928 Washington Senators team page at www.baseball-almanac.com

Minnesota Twins seasons
Washington Senators season
Washing